Predeal Pass is a mountain pass (elevation ) in the Carpathian Mountains in Romania. It connects the Prahova River valley to the south with the lowlands around Brașov to the north. It separates the Southern Carpathians (Bucegi Mountains) from the Eastern Carpathians (Piatra Mare Mountains). It is an important passage for traffic between southern Romania (including the capital Bucharest) and central Romania (eastern Transylvania), crossed by National Road 1 and the Bucharest—Brașov railway. The town Predeal is situated near the pass.

Mountain passes of Romania
Mountain passes of the Carpathians